Earth vs. The Pipettes is the second studio album from the British girl group, The Pipettes, and first album as a duo. "Our Love was Saved By Spacemen" was released as a viral video online, and received generally positive reviews from websites such as PopJustice and PopMatters.

"Stop The Music," their official first single from the album, was released on 19 April 2010. Its music video was released on 23 March 2010.

Reception

Earth vs. The Pipettes was met with "mixed or average" reviews from critics. At Metacritic, which assigns a weighted average rating out of 100 to reviews from mainstream publications, this release received an average score of 54 based on 12 reviews.

In a review for AllMusic, critic reviewer Tim Sendra wrote: "Though almost nothing on the record will appeal to the people who liked their earlier work because of the girl group connection, fans of cotton-candied pop sung by girls who sound like they live on a diet of helium and gummy bears will find Earth vs. the Pipettes just about perfect." Erin Hall of Filter said: "Earth vs. The Pipettes has none of the punch of the group's first outing. In place of the sassy, empowered lyrics of We Are The Pipettes, we get cloying, clingy tales of pining sung over redundant disco beats." At Slant Magazine, Jonathan Keefe explained that "there’s simply nothing about Earth vs. the Pipettes that's distinctive or in any way better than what other '80s revivalists have already done."

Formats and track listings

References

2010 albums
The Pipettes albums
Fortuna Pop! Records albums